Charmed Life is an album by the punk rock group Half Japanese, released in 1988. It is their second studio album released on their label, 50 Skidillion Watts.

The eighth song, "Bright Lights, Big City," was originally sung and recorded by the American blues musician Jimmy Reed, in 1961.

Critical reception
The Quietus wrote: "Less whiny and needy than Music To Strip By, the lyrics are spouted from a lip with more curl and less pucker ... as accessible as Half Japanese get." Trouser Press called the album "a guileless burst of optimism that mutes the shriller frequencies considerably, replacing them with an unaffected, exuberant guitar/harmonica backdrop played by a band."

Track listing

Personnel 
Jad Fair - guitar, harmonica, vocals
David Fair - guitar, harmonica, vocals
Don Fleming - guitar, vocals
John Dreyfuss - organ, saxophone
Rick Dreyfuss - composer
Mark Jickling - bass guitar, guitar
John Moremen - guitar
Jay Spiegel - drums
Don Zientara - engineer, mixing

References

1988 albums
Half Japanese albums
50 Skidillion Watts albums